Kevin Freiberger (born 16 November 1988) is a German football forward who plays for Gütersloh.

Career statistics

1.Includes DFB-Pokal.
2.Includes Regionalliga playoff.

References

External links
 

1988 births
Living people
Footballers from Essen
German footballers
Association football midfielders
SC Verl players
VfL Bochum players
VfL Bochum II players
SV Wacker Burghausen players
Sportfreunde Lotte players
VfL Osnabrück players
Rot-Weiss Essen players
Chemnitzer FC players
FC Gütersloh 2000 players
2. Bundesliga players
3. Liga players
Regionalliga players
Oberliga (football) players